Kim Yeong-il (born 25 May 1970) is a South Korean wrestler. He competed in the men's Greco-Roman 68 kg at the 1996 Summer Olympics.

References

1970 births
Living people
South Korean male sport wrestlers
Olympic wrestlers of South Korea
Wrestlers at the 1996 Summer Olympics
Place of birth missing (living people)
Asian Games medalists in wrestling
Wrestlers at the 1994 Asian Games
Asian Games gold medalists for South Korea
Medalists at the 1994 Asian Games
20th-century South Korean people
21st-century South Korean people